Cyprus College is a for-profit college in Nicosia, Cyprus. It was founded in 1961 by Ioannis Gregoriou as a business school, and thereafter it expanded into a number of other fields, including computer science, graduate studies, and social sciences. In 2006, when the college had an enrolment of 3,500, it submitted under the Deanship of Andreas G Orphanides an application to the Ministry of Education and Culture of the Republic of Cyprus to establish a private university with the name European University Cyprus. Approval for this came in September 2007, and Cyprus College continued its operation independently of European University Cyprus.

References

External links
Cyprus College

Educational institutions established in 1961
For-profit universities and colleges in Europe
Universities and colleges in Cyprus
Education in Nicosia
1961 establishments in Cyprus